The discography of Rory Gallagher, an Irish guitarist and singer-songwriter, consists of 11 studio albums, 6 live albums, 13 compilations, and 5 singles.  Gallagher was a solo artist for much of his career and collaborated with artists such as Muddy Waters and Jerry Lee Lewis. Before his career as a solo artist, Gallagher was the guitarist, vocalist, and saxophonist for the Irish rock trio Taste.

Taste 
Having completed a musical apprenticeship in the Irish showbands, and influenced by the increasing popularity of beat groups during the early 1960s, Gallagher formed Taste, a blues rock and R&B power trio, in 1966. Initially, the band was composed of Gallagher and two Cork musicians, Norman Damery and Eric Kitteringham, however, by 1968, they were replaced with two musicians from Belfast, featuring Gallagher on guitar and vocals, drummer John Wilson, and bassist Richard McCracken. Performing extensively in the United Kingdom, the group played regularly at the Marquee Club, supporting both Cream at their Royal Albert Hall farewell concert, and the blues supergroup Blind Faith on a tour of North America. Managed by Eddie Kennedy, the trio released the albums Taste and On The Boards, and two live recordings, Live Taste and Live at the Isle of Wight. The latter appeared long after the band's break-up, which occurred shortly after their appearance at the 1970 Isle of Wight Festival.

Solo career 
After the break-up of Taste, Gallagher toured under his own name, hiring former Deep Joy bass player Gerry McAvoy to play on his eponymous debut album, Rory Gallagher. It was the beginning of a twenty-year musical relationship between Gallagher and McAvoy; the other band member was drummer Wilgar Campbell. The 1970s were Gallagher's most prolific period. He produced ten albums in that decade, including two live albums, Live in Europe and Irish Tour '74. November 1971 saw the release of his album, Deuce. Around the same time, he was voted Melody Maker'''s International Top Musician of the Year, ahead of Eric Clapton. However, despite a number of his albums from this period reaching the UK Albums Chart, Gallagher did not attain major star status.

Gallagher is documented in the 1974 film Irish Tour '74, directed by Tony Palmer. During the heightened periods of political unrest in Ireland, as other artists were warned not to tour, Gallagher was resolute about touring Ireland at least once a year during his career, winning him the dedication of thousands of fans, and in the process, becoming a role model for other aspiring young Irish musicians.  The line-up for the Irish Tour which included Rod de'Ath on drums and Lou Martin on keyboards, performed together between 1973 and 1976.  Releases from that period include Blueprint, Tattoo, Irish Tour '74, Against the Grain and Calling Card. This Gallagher band performed several TV and radio shows across Europe, including Beat-Club in Bremen, Germany and the Old Grey Whistle Test. Gallagher recorded two Peel Sessions, both in February 1973 and containing the same tracks, but only the first was broadcast. Along with Little Feat and Roger McGuinn, Gallagher performed the first Rockpalast live concert at the Grugahalle, Essen, Germany in 1977.

In 1978 Gallagher trimmed his band down to just bass, guitar and drums, and the act became a power trio as Taste had been. This line-up produced Photo-Finish, Top Priority,  Jinx, Defender, and Fresh Evidence. During this period Gallagher was often obsessive over details and plagued by self-doubt yet he retained a loyal fan base.

Collaborations and posthumous releases
Gallagher collaborated with Jerry Lee Lewis and Muddy Waters on their respective London Sessions in the mid-1970s. He played on Lonnie Donegan's final album. He was David Coverdale's second choice (after Jeff Beck) to replace Ritchie Blackmore in Deep Purple although Gallagher chose to remain a solo artist.  When former members of the Yardbirds (Chris Dreja, Paul Samwell-Smith, and Jim McCarty) reunited to create the band Box of Frogs Gallagher was invited to record with them on their first album.

Gallagher's career was cut short due to his untimely death on 14 June 1995.  He died from complications after a liver transplant. Several posthumous albums have emerged since his death. Two of the most notable are Wheels Within Wheels, a compilation of acoustic folk and blues music released in 2003 and Notes From San Francisco'', an album of unreleased studio tracks and a San Francisco 1979 concert released in 2011.

Albums

Taste albums

Solo albums

Posthumous albums

Compilation albums

Box sets

Singles

With Taste
 "Blister on the Moon" / "Born on the Wrong Side of Time" – UK 1968 [a]
 "Born on the Wrong Side of Time" / "Same Old Story" –  UK/ EU/ JPN, 1969
 "What's Going On" / "Railway and Gun" – EU 1970 [b] NL #22 
 "If I Don't Sing I'll Cry" / "I'll Remember" – ESP 1970 
 "Wee Wee Baby" / "You've Got to Play" – GER 1972
 "Blister on the Moon" / "Sugar Mama" / "Catfish" / "On the Boards" – UK 1982

Solo
 "Moonchild" / Calling Card" – GER/ NL 1977
 "Shadow Play" / "Brute Force and Ignorance" / "Souped-up Ford" – UK/ IRL #24, 1979 
 "Philby" / "Hellcat" / "Country Mile" – UK/ EU/ AUS 1979 [c]
 "Wayward Child" (live) / "Keychain" – UK/ IRL 1980 
 "Big Guns" / "The Devil Made Me Do It" – UK/ IRL 1982

notes;
 a^ – re-released in 1970 with the sides reversed.
 b^ – b/w "Morning Sun" in some countries.
 c^ – standard two-track single in some countries.

Videography
All titles released on the DVD format.

Guest appearances

References

External links

Rory Gallagher Discography accessed 18 December 2009
Cradle Rock Rory Gallagher discography and filmography accessed 18 December 2009

Blues discographies
Discographies of Irish artists